

This page lists board and card games, wargames, miniatures games, and tabletop role-playing games published in 1980.  For video games, see 1980 in video gaming.

Games released or invented in 1980

Games awards given in 1980
 Spiel des Jahres: Rummikub

Significant games-related events of 1980
 FASA Corporation founded by Jordan Weisman and L. Ross Babcock III.
 Iron Crown Enterprises founded.
 Steve Jackson Games founded.

See also
 1980 in video gaming

Games
Games by year